The 1918 United States Senate election in Michigan took place on November 5, 1918. Incumbent Republican Senator William Alden Smith did not seek re-election to a third term in office. In the race to succeed him, Republican former Secretary of the Navy Truman Handy Newberry defeated the automobile industrialist Henry Ford. Ford first challenged Newberry in the Republican primary and lost and then faced Newberry again, running as the Democratic nominee in the general election.

The race was highly controversial for campaign spending practices by both major candidates, with Newberry also hammering Ford for his pacifism during World War I, his antisemitism, and for helping his son Edsel avoid the draft. Newberry narrowly won the election but was ultimately forced to resign from the Senate under scrutiny for his campaign spending in this race.

Republican primary

Candidates
Henry Ford, industrialist and anti-war activist
Truman Handy Newberry, former Secretary of the Navy
Chase S. Osborn, former Governor of Michigan (1911–13)
William G. Simpson

Withdrew
William Alden Smith, incumbent Senator since 1907 (withdrew July 26) 
Fred M. Warner, former Governor of Michigan (1905–11) (withdrew June 18)

Declined
James J. Couzens, Mayor of Detroit
Arthur Vandenberg, publisher at the Grand Rapids Herald, a newspaper owned by Senator Smith

Campaign
In August 1917, Governor Albert E. Sleeper and his staff, disappointed in Senator William Alden Smith, suggested former Secretary of the Navy Truman Handy Newberry run for Smith's seat. They encouraged Newberry, by way of an intermediary, to run. In October, a meeting of Sleeper's staff was held at Port Huron, where the Governor pledged to stay out of the race, although his staff were unanimous in support of Newberry. A month later, a letter was drafted by one of the men present, Roger M. Andrews, encouraging Newberry to enter the race as Sleeper's preferred candidate. Newberry responded that the race was "intensely interesting" to him.

By February 1918, Newberry had begun building a campaign apparatus, hiring Paul H. King of Detroit to manage his campaign on March 1. King  gradually built an extremely large campaign staff throughout the state, headquartered at the Ford Building in Detroit.

On June 7, former Governor Fred M. Warner entered the race only to withdraw eleven days later after Henry Ford entered the race. After much speculation, Ford formally announced his campaign on June 14, 1918 with the endorsement of President Woodrow Wilson. Senator Smith finally ended his re-election campaign on July 26, the day before the deadline for filing nominating petitions.

In early August, newspapers including the Escanaba Journal, Charlotte Republican, and Senator Smith's own Grand Rapids Herald (under the pen of Arthur Vandenberg) published editorials criticizing Newberry for his excessive campaign spending and declaring that Newberry should not be nominated because if elected, there would be no difficulty for Democrats to prove he had obtained his seat illegally. Newberry replied that he had the assurance of his campaign staff that all expenditures were within the law. On August 15, his campaign committee echoed this statement. Vandenberg, Lieutenant Governor Luren Dickinson, and State Representative Merlin Wiley, who was managing the Osborn campaign, were harshly critical of the campaign's response.

Results
The primary election was held on August 27 and resulted in a victory for Newberry.

On September 6, the Newberry campaign committee reported $176,560.08 of spending on the primary campaign, of which $147,860.16 was for "advertising and other publicity." Newberry's largest donations came from his brother John, his brother-in-law Victor Barnes, and Henry B. Joy, president of Packard Motors.

Democratic primary

Candidates
 Henry Ford, industrialist and anti-war activist
 James W. Helme

Campaign
Democrats were behind Ford from the start. President Wilson's endorsement was preceded by a June 4 meeting of the Democratic state committee at Lansing, where Democrats called for Ford as the compromise candidate of all parties and demanded that all Republican candidates withdraw from the race.

However, a dissident movement led by William J. Mickel instead supported James W. Helme for the nomination.

Results
The primary election was held on August 27 and resulted in a victory for Ford.

General election

Campaign
Newberry's extravagant primary spending became a focus of the general election campaign. In an open letter published September 17, ex-Governor Osborn congratulated Newberry on his victory and pledged his support but urged Newberry to confess that he had knowingly broken campaign finance laws without realizing the enormity of his offense. The same day, Democratic U.S. Senator Atlee Pomerene of Ohio presented a resolution for an investigation of Newberry's campaign for extravagant expenses; the resolution was postponed until after the election by a vote of 10–1. Billboards and other campaign advertisements were posted attacking Newberry's spending, primary opponent William G. Simpson published another letter on October 6 arraigning Newberry, and several of his campaign staff were held in contempt of court for refusing to testify to a federal grand jury in response to subpoenas.

Results

Aftermath

Senate investigation

65th Congress
Ford initially declined to seek a recount, his secretary stating, "We believe that the campaign has been clean, as campaigns go, and therefore are willing to abide by the return sheets." One week later, however, Ford hinted at the possibility of a recount, arguing that Wall Street conspired to back Newberry because he opposed President Wilson.

In December, Ford's counsel obtained court orders for the preservation of ballots, poll books, and tally sheets. Ford petitioned the Senate on January 6, 1919 to recount the November ballots and investigate the primary and general elections. Ford and Newberry were invited to testify before the Senate Committee on Privileges and Elections on January 17, where Ford's counsel asked for an immediate investigation and recount, claiming that Newberry had only acknowledged a fraction of his spending and had actually spent $500,000 in the primary campaign. A resolution to that effect was presented by Senator Henry F. Ashurst and it passed the committee with one Republican vote.

On January 27, the same day the Ford challenge resolution passed out of committee, U.S. Senator Charles E. Townsend of Michigan presented a letter from Senator-elect Newberry accusing Ford of running "the most elaborate, expensive, and pretentious [campaign] in the history of the State" and charging improper and unlawful practices by Ford workers in Wayne County, a normally Republican stronghold which Ford had won by 35,000 votes. A resolution to investigate the counter-charges was presented on January 28.

Ford denied the charges "in as emphatic language as parliamentary rules will permit."

Ultimately, the Committee on Privileges and Elections, in recognition that the case would come before the following Senate seated in March, submitted a substitute Resolution, authorizing the preservation of ballots and documents for the hearing of testimony and actual recount by the next Congress. It was ultimately conceded that no challenge could be made to seating Newberry until he had actually received his credentials from Senator Smith on March 3.

66th Congress
In the 66th Congress, Republicans overtook the Democrats as the majority party in the Senate, and Privileges and Elections Chairman Pomerene was replaced by William P. Dillingham of Vermont. At the opening of the new Congress, the Ford petition was once again laid before the committee. Another resolution for the preservation of evidence, recount of ballots, and investigation of charges and counter-charges to be reported to the Senate was reported favorably on June 18, and reported favorably from the Committee to Audit and Control the Contingent Expenses of the Senate on December 3.

Criminal investigation

Separately, Ford employed at least 40 private investigators to investigate. They compiled their report and sent it to the U.S. Department of Justice, which assigned a special prosecutor who was a friend of Ford's lead investigator. 

The Department of Justice began its investigation as early as August 1918. A corps of investigations, led by elections fraud experts Earl Houck and Frank Dailey, were sent to Michigan to investigate bank records and safety deposit vaults and successfully influenced local political leaders with hints of bribes from Newberry. During subsequent Senate debate, Senator Townsend decried the investigatory effort to "collective evidence of something which would help the administration's candidate for Senator [referring to Ford]" but did admit Newberry's spending was "unconscionable" and had been detrimental to Newberry's own campaign.

On October 18, 1919, the Department of Justice announced it would bring fraud charges against Newberry in front of a grand jury. The grand jury was empaneled on October 22 in the United States District Court for the Western District of Michigan and it found an indictment on six counts against Newberry and 134 on November 29. The defendants were charged with violations of the Federal Corrupt Practices Act and Michigan statutes made applicable by that Act, forbidding a candidate to contribute or expend more than $3,750 in procuring his own nomination or election. They were also charged with conspiracy to violate federal anti-bribery law and conspiracy to commit mail fraud by embezzling some of the campaign funds for themselves.

Prosecutors presented evidence alleging fraudulent expenditures of between $500,000 and $1,000,000 in connection with the primary and a vast political conspiracy throughout the state, including bribery, corruption of the press and elections boards, and voter fraud. Defendants argued that the government had failed to adequately present their evidence, leaving the defendants in ignorance of the specific acts and witnesses on whom the government had relied to build its case. On January 5, the defendants argued on demurrer that the indictment was unauthorized because Congress lacked the power to regulate primary elections; though the judge denied the motion to demur, the Supreme Court later upheld this argument in Newberry v. United States.

Newberry appeal
Newberry would successfully appeal his conviction to the Supreme Court, who ruled the FCPA unconstitutional in a 5–4 decision in Newberry v. United States. Newberry was allowed to retain his seat, but faced a condemnation by the Senate for his excess spending. Newberry ultimately resigned in 1922 and was succeeded by James J. Couzens, the Republican Mayor of Detroit and a former executive of the Ford Motor Company.

References

Bibliography

Further reading 
 

1918
Michigan
United States Senate
Henry Ford